Ashington End is a hamlet in the East Lindsey district of Lincolnshire, England.

Hamlets in Lincolnshire
Burgh le Marsh